On the Way may refer to:

Film
On the Way, a 1999 South Korean docudrama featuring Moon Geun-young
On the Way (film), a 2014 Chinese-South Korean film directed by Kim Poog-ki
On the Way, a 2014 Indian Malayalam-language film featuring Sidhartha Siva

Music

Albums
On the Way (The Boss album), 2013
On the Way (Jandek album), 1988
On the Way, by Abra Moore, 2007

Songs
"On the Way", by Dinosaur Jr. from Where You Been, 1993
"On the Way", by Gerry Rafferty from Sleepwalking, 1982
"On the Way", by Jhené Aiko from Chilombo, 2020
"On the Way", by Onew from Dice, 2022
"On the Way", by Paul McCartney from McCartney II, 1980
"On the Way", by Twenty88 from Twenty88, 2016